The Minnesota Radio Talking Book Network was the world's first radio reading service for the blind; the first on-air date was January 2, 1969. The purpose of a radio reading service is to make current print material available, through the medium of a radio, to those who cannot read it because of a physical condition such as blindness, visual disability, dyslexia, or strokes. In 1969, there were no other options available to blind and visually impaired people.

The Minnesota Radio Talking Book Network, at that time called the Radio Talking Book, was started as a side-channel radio on KSJR-FM, itself fairly new at the time. KSJR began January 22, 1967, as the classical radio station belonging to St. John's University, and was called MER, Minnesota Educational Radio. In 1974, the station's name was changed to Minnesota Public Radio, MPR.

In 1967 and 1968, conversations took place between Father Colman Barry, OSB, president of St. John's University, William Kling, manager of the station, and C. Stanley Potter, Director of the State Services for the Blind from 1948 to 1985.

It was decided to place the Radio Talking Book as part of the Hamm Recording Project, which was begun by the Hamm Foundation in 1953 as a public-private partnership in association with Minnesota State Services for the Blind. In 1953, the purpose of the Hamm Recording Project was to make textbooks, Minnesota magazines and Minnesota authors available in an audio format for people who were blind and visually impaired. By 1969, the Hamm Recording Project was known as the Communication Center, was also providing Braille for Minnesotans, and had expanded their volunteer base considerably. It seemed an obvious location for the Radio Talking Book.

With the assistance of Communication Center engineer Robert Watson, a closed circuit radio was designed that would pick up only the signal of the new Radio Talking Book, and the station began. The initial schedule had the Minneapolis Tribune newspaper read live on the air for two hours each morning, the Saint Paul Dispatch read for two hours each evening, and the remainder of the hours of the day were filled with programming from just over 20 magazines and a wide variety of books which were read serially.

By the present day, that programming is two hours of the combined Minneapolis and Saint Paul papers in the morning, two hours of the New York Times in the evening, 11 hours per day of programming from serialized current-copyright books, and programming from over 300 periodicals. The programming is interrupted in six smaller Minnesota cities where teams of volunteers read local newspapers on the air. The programming is carried on satellite where it is picked up by many other radio reading services across the hemisphere, and it is streamed on the Internet. Copies of all books recorded by the Minnesota Radio Talking Book Network are also made available to blind, visually impaired, and other print disabled Americans through the Minnesota Braille and Talking Book Library.

The inauguration of a radio reading service inspired other locations around the country to begin similar services. By 1975, there were enough of them formed that they decided to create the Association of Radio Reading Services, which was headed by C. Stanley Potter. That organization eventually became the International Association of Audio Information Reading Services, IAAIS, and includes member services that provide access to the printed word in any audio format.

See also 
West German Audio Book Library for the Blind

References

External link

Radio reading services of the United States
1969 establishments in Minnesota